The American Jewish World is a newspaper published in Minnesota. It began as a 16-page weekly on July 30, 1915 as a means of uniting Jews from Minnesota behind the cause of Zionism. In 1964 the newspaper changed to a five-column tabloid format. In 2009 publication changed to biweekly, and as subscriptions and advertising revenue continued to fall it switched to a monthly schedule from March 2019.

History 
The paper was founded by Samuel Deinard, an Eastern European Jew who arrived in Minneapolis in 1901 to serve as the rabbi of Reform Judaism Temple Shaarei Tov. He had first launched a newspaper titled Jewish Progress in 1904 and Judean in 1905 but these both soon failed. He launched another weekly paper Scribe in 1907 which included a four-page Yiddish supplement. This too failed, and in 1912 he launched Jewish Weekly which lasted six months. It relaunched as American Jewish World (AJW) in 1915.

In 1921, Deinard died suddenly age 48. The assistant editor Frisch. Rabbi C. David Matt of the Adath Jeshurun Congregation took over as publisher, maintaining the role for over 60 years.

References 

 
 

Mass media in Minneapolis–Saint Paul
Jewish American culture
Jewish newspapers published in the United States